Celebrity Big Brother 17 was the seventeenth series of the British reality television series Celebrity Big Brother, hosted by Emma Willis and narrated by Marcus Bentley. The series launched on 5 January 2016 on Channel 5 in the United Kingdom and TV3 in the Republic of Ireland, and concluded 32 days later on 5 February 2016, making it the longest celebrity series to date, along with Celebrity Big Brother 19 and Celebrity Big Brother 21. It was the tenth celebrity series and the fifteenth series of Big Brother overall to air on Channel 5. First details of the series were released on 7 December 2015 when the new eye was released, and a new "vaudeville theatre" theme also being confirmed.

This series was the first celebrity edition to launch under the new three-year contract that was announced in March 2015 which guaranteed the show remained on Channel 5 until 2018.

With sixteen celebrities, this series had the most housemates since the show began in 2001. However this is now held by Celebrity Big Brother 19 with eighteen. With three voluntary exits from Angie Bowie, David Gest and Jonathan Cheban, this series equalled the record with series 5 in 2007, which also had three housemates walk from the house. On 5 February 2016, the series was won by Scotty T, with Stephanie Davis finishing as runner-up.

Production

Sponsorship
Celebrity Big Brother 17 had no sponsorship, making it the first series of either Big Brother and Celebrity Big Brother not to have a sponsor since Celebrity Big Brother 1 in 2001.

House
A Channel 5 producer teased: "The famous house has undergone a major costume change, and housemates will be transported to a striking and theatrical setting which echoes the vaudeville theatres of a bygone era. The BB garden has been transformed into a Whitechapel style foggy street scene with a Victorian pub snug which will provide a hidden corner for sharing secrets and backstage backstabbing." Pictures of the new house were revealed on 18 December.

The House remains structurally similar to the previous series, however the kitchen and living area have swapped positions. What's more, the House has an old-age feel, with a Victorian pub-style kitchen area and theatre curtains down the staircase.

Housemates
The official list of Housemates was confirmed on 5 January 2016.

Angie Bowie
Angie Bowie is an American actress, model and musician. She is the ex-wife of English musician David Bowie and the mother of film director Duncan Jones. She entered the house on Day 1. On Day 7, Angie was informed off-camera that her ex-husband David Bowie had died, however she decided to remain in the house despite being given the option to leave. Angie voluntarily left the house on Day 15.

Christopher Maloney
Christopher Maloney was a contestant on the ninth series of The X Factor; where he reached the final, finishing third. He competed in the same series as Big Brother's Bit on the Side host Rylan Clark. He entered the house on Day 1. He became the fifth housemate to be evicted on Day 22.

Danniella Westbrook
Danniella Westbrook is an English actress, most notable for playing Sam Mitchell in the BBC soap opera EastEnders on and off between 1990 and 2016. In 2013, she appeared as Trudy Ryan in Hollyoaks. She also competed in the second series of I'm a Celebrity...Get Me Out of Here! in 2003 before taking part in Dancing on Ice in 2010. She entered the house on Day 1. She finished in fifth place on Day 32.

Darren Day
Darren Day is an English actor and television personality well known for his West End theatre starring roles, and briefly appearing in the Channel 4 soap opera Hollyoaks as Danny Houston in 2010. He entered the house on Day 1 but spent the first night in "The Box" following the launch night twist. He finished in third place on Day 32.

David Gest
David Gest was an American producer, television personality, and ex-husband of Liza Minnelli. He entered the house on Day 1. On Day 13, David left the house on medical grounds. On 12 April 2016, Gest died of a stroke.

Gemma Collins
Gemma Collins is an English reality television personality, best known for starring in the ITV2 semi-reality programme The Only Way Is Essex from the second series in 2011 until the fifteenth series in 2015. She has also taken part in a number of reality shows such as Splash! and I'm a Celebrity...Get Me Out of Here! where she left the jungle after three days. She was the first to enter the house on Day 1. She became the seventh housemate to be evicted on Day 29.

Jeremy McConnell
Jeremy McConnell is an Irish model and reality television star, who was featured as a cast member in MTV's Beauty School Cop Outs. He is best friends with ex Big Brother housemate Marc O'Neill.  He entered the house on Day 1. He was the sixth housemate to be evicted on Day 25.

John Partridge
John Partridge is an English actor who is known best for playing Christian Clarke in the BBC soap opera EastEnders regularly from 2008 to 2012, and then again in 2014, 2015 and 2016 for three guest appearances. He entered the house on Day 1 but spent the first night in "The Box" following the launch night twist. He left the house on Day 32, finishing in sixth place.

Jonathan Cheban
Jonathan Cheban is an American television personality and founder of website TheDishh.com. He is best known for his friendship with Kim Kardashian as well as appearing in her reality shows such as Keeping Up with the Kardashians. He entered the house on Day 1. Jonathan voluntarily left the house on Day 7.

Kristina Rihanoff
Kristina Rihanoff is a Russian ballroom dancer and choreographer, who had competed as one of the female professional partners on Strictly Come Dancing, from 2008 to 2015. She entered the house on Day 1. On Day 3, Kristina announced that she was three months pregnant. She became the third housemate to be evicted on Day 15.

Megan McKenna
Megan McKenna is an English reality television star, who was featured as a cast member on the third series of MTV's Ex on the Beach where she came known for her fling with The Magaluf Weekender star Jordan Davies. She entered the house on Day 1. On Day 10, Megan was issued a formal warning for aggressive behaviour and language used during an argument the previous night. On Day 18, she became the fourth housemate to be evicted. She briefly returned to the house on Day 30 as part of a task.

Nancy Dell'Olio
Nancy Dell'Olio is an Italian-English lawyer who first came to public notice as the girlfriend of Sven-Göran Eriksson, the manager of the England national football team. During their turbulent relationship, Sven was known to have had affairs with ex-celebrity housemates Faria Alam and Ulrika Jonsson. She was the final housemate to enter the house on Day 1. She became the second housemate to be evicted on Day 11.

Scotty T
Scott Timlin (also known as Scotty T) is an English reality television personality, who rose to fame as a cast member in the MTV reality series, Geordie Shore from series 4 onwards. He entered the house on Day 1. On Day 32, he left the house as the winner of the series making him the second star of Geordie Shore to win following Charlotte Crosby.

Stephanie Davis
Stephanie Davis is an English actress and most notable for playing Sinead O'Connor in the Channel 4 soap opera Hollyoaks from 2010 until 2015 where she was axed from the show. Prior to this she competed in the 2010 BBC talent-search Over the Rainbow. She entered the house on Day 1. On Day 13, Stephanie was given a warning for using threatening language the previous night. On Day 24, she was given another warning for her behaviour during an argument the previous night. She finished as runner-up on Day 32.

Tiffany Pollard
Tiffany Pollard, also known by her stage name New York, is an American reality television personality and actress; best known for her appearances in VH1's reality shows such as Flavor of Love and I Love New York. She entered the house on Day 1. On Day 7 she mistakenly declared David Gest had died, after housemate Angie Bowie confided in her that "David's dead." On Day 10, Tiffany was issued a warning for aggressive behaviour used in an argument during the previous night. She finished in fourth place on Day 32.

Winston McKenzie
Winston McKenzie is an English perennial candidate for office and former boxer. He entered the house on Day 1. On Day 3, Winston received a warning regarding unacceptable behaviour towards the women in the house. He became the first to be evicted on Day 4 and was heavily booed. During his time in the house, he caused a lot of controversy, including his VT on entering the house with comments which were perceived by many to be homophobic. This caused a number of complaints to Ofcom. Furthermore, on Day 3, his quoted comment about comparing same-sex adoption to "child abuse" drew widespread outrage and heavy criticism from his fellow housemates and host Emma Willis.

Summary

Nominations table

Notes

Ratings
Official ratings are taken from BARB. The official ratings data for the episodes from 1 February 2016 to 5 February 2016 were not reported on the BARB website, it is unknown when or if this information will be released. The series average of 2.8 million is for the confirmed ratings

References

External links
 Official website 
 

2016 British television seasons
17